Bang Khan is a district (amphoe) of Nakhon Si Thammarat province, southern Thailand.

Geography
Neighboring districts are (from the north clockwise): Thung Yai and Thung Song of Nakhon Si Thammarat; Ratsada, Huai Yot, and Wang Wiset of Trang province; and Lam Thap of Krabi province.

History
The district was created as a minor district (king amphoe) on 1 April 1984, when the three tambons Bang Khan, Ban Lamnao, and Wang Hin were split off from Thung Song district. On 9 April 1992 the minor district was upgraded to a full district.

Administration
The district is divided into four sub-districts (tambons), which are further subdivided into 60 villages (mubans). There are no municipal (thesaban) areas, and three tambon administrative organizations (TAO).

References

External links
amphoe.com

Districts of Nakhon Si Thammarat province